Bramwell Historic District is a national historic district  located at Bramwell, Mercer County, West Virginia.  The district includes 65 contributing buildings and 2 contributing structures in the central business district and surrounding residential areas of Bramwell. Most of the buildings pre-date the 1920s.  Notable buildings include the Bramwell Town Hall (c. 1889), Bryant Building (c. 1910) (Bryant Pharmacy and soda fountain, the pharmacy later became the Corner Shop Diner with the original soda fountain), Masonic Hall (c. 1893-1894), Cooper House (1910), Cooper Indoor Pool (1910), Cooper Garage Apartment (1910), Bank of Bramwell (c. 1893), Perry House (c. 1901-1904), Hewitt House (1914-1915), Hewitt Garage Apartment (1914-1915), Mann House, Bramwell Presbyterian Church (1902), Goodwill House (c. 1894, 1905), Thomas House (c. 1909-1912), Thomas Garage / Apartment (c. 1909-1912), Buck/Bowen House (c. 1900), Mann Playhouse (c. 1910), Freeman House (c. 1893), and Former Holy Trinity Episcopal Church (c. 1895).

It was listed on the National Register of Historic Places in 1983.

References

External links
Historic Bramwell

Historic districts in Mercer County, West Virginia
National Register of Historic Places in Mercer County, West Virginia
Historic districts on the National Register of Historic Places in West Virginia